A mineral is an element or chemical compound that is normally crystalline, formed as a result of geological processes.

Mineral may also refer to:

Mineral water, water containing dissolved minerals of the sense above
Mineral (nutrient), an element required by living organisms
Mineral resources, geological deposits (crystalline, non-crystalline, solid, liquid or gas) which potentially can be mined

Places
Mineral, California
Mineral, Washington
Mineral del Monte, Hidalgo, Mexico
Mineral, Illinois
Mineral, Oklahoma
Mineral Township, Bureau County, Illinois, United States
Mineral Township, Cherokee County, Kansas, United States
Mineral Township, Barry County, Missouri, United States
Mineral Township, Venango County, Pennsylvania, United States
Mineral, Texas
Mineral, Virginia

Other uses
Mineral (band), an emo band
Mineral River, a river in Michigan
Soft drinks, in some English speaking countries

See also
Mineral City (disambiguation)
Mineral County (disambiguation)